Melody  is a 2014 Belgian drama film directed by Bernard Bellefroid. It was written by Bellefroid and Carine Zimmerlin. It was nominated for four Magritte Awards, including Best Film and Best Director for Bellefroid.

Cast
 Rachael Blake as Emily
 Lucie Debay as Melody
 Don Gallagher as Gary
 Laure Roldan as Marion
 Clive Hayward as Norman
 Catherine Salée as Catherine
 Lana Macanovic as Doctor Sirenko

References

External links

2014 films
2014 drama films
Belgian drama films
Luxembourgian drama films
French drama films
Films about surrogacy
2010s French-language films
French-language Belgian films
2010s French films
French pregnancy films
Belgian pregnancy films